Tabanus fuscopunctatus is a species of horse fly in the family Tabanidae.

Distribution
United States.

References

Tabanidae
Insects described in 1850
Taxa named by Pierre-Justin-Marie Macquart
Diptera of North America